Nan-o kabab (Persian: نان كباب) (bread with kabab) is a national dish of Iran. The meal is simple, consisting of kabab, of which there are several Iranian varieties, and a type of Iranian flat bread (specifically nan-e lavash). It is served everywhere throughout Iran today, but traditionally was associated with the southern and central parts of the country, and probably originated in the province of Fars.

Traditionally, this dish is restricted to kabab koobideh (the most common variety of nan-o kabab), as well as jujeh kabab, shish kabab, shishleek, and chenjeh. Kabab barg is never used, and is strictly associated with chelow kabab.

Kebabs
Iranian cuisine
Azerbaijani cuisine
Kurdish cuisine